Hikmat al-Shihabi (8 January 1931 – 5 March 2013), also known as Hikmat Shihabi, was a Syrian career military officer, who served as the chief of staff of the Syrian Army between 1974 and 1998. As a Sunni, he was considered one of several non-Alawi members of the inner circle of former Syrian President Hafez al-Assad.

Early life and education
Shihabi was born into a Sunni family in 1931 in Al-Bab, Aleppo province. He attended Homs military academy and then had advanced military training in the United States.

Career
Shihabi began his career in aviation, training in the Soviet Union and the United States. From 1968 to 1971 he served as deputy head of the military security department. In 1970, he earned a Soviet degree in intelligence services. In April 1971, he was named head of Syrian military intelligence, with Colonel Ali Duba serving as his deputy. He was promoted to a general the following year, and supervised the department of military security. After the 1973 Yom Kippur War, he led the Syrian delegation to the United States in April 1974, negotiating the conditions of the Syrian–Israeli disengagement. On 12 August 1974, he was appointed chief of staff of the Syrian Army, replacing Youssef Chakkour, who was promoted to deputy defense minister. In December 1983, while President Hafez Assad was ill, Shihabi was part, along with General Mustafa Tlass and Ali Duba, of the committee in charge of running the country. From 1994 to 1995 he was part of a delegation that traveled to the United States to discuss peace negotiations with Israel. His term as chief of staff lasted until 1998.

Shihabii was also one of Ba'ath Party's four-member “old guard” members of the Regional Command.

Resignation
On 8 July 1998, after 24 years as army chief of staff, Shihabi resigned his post prior to Hafez Assad's death and was succeeded by Ali Aslan. Shihabi cited health reasons and a heart condition when asked about his resignation by president Assad who wanted to extend his service. In 2000, rumors surfaced in Syrian newspapers, which proved false, claiming that Shihabi would soon be indicted on corruption charges.

Alliances
Shihabi was one of the senior Syrian officials who were close to late Rafik Hariri, former prime minister of Lebanon, and Lebanon's Druze leader Walid Jumblatt.

Death
Shihabi died on 5 March 2013.

References

1931 births
2013 deaths
Shihab family
Homs Military Academy alumni
People from Al-Bab District
Syrian Sunni Muslims
Chiefs of Staff of the Syrian Army
Members of the Regional Command of the Arab Socialist Ba'ath Party – Syria Region
People of the Islamic uprising in Syria